The 2025 Southeast Asian Games, officially the 33rd Southeast Asian Games, or the 2025 SEA Games and also known as Bangkok–Chonburi–Songkhla 2025 or Thailand 2025, is an upcoming international multi-sport event sanctioned by the Southeast Asian Games Federation (SEAGF), scheduled to be held from 9 to 20 December 2025 with Bangkok Metropolitan Region, Chonburi, and Songkhla as their main host cities and other cities Thailand for the football tournament. The joint bid from the three cities was awarded the Games on 13 January 2023, after Thailand was confirmed as the host country by the Southeast Asian Games Federation (SEAGF). It was the first time that the host cities were selected to host the Southeast Asian Games through the bidding and election process.

This will be the seventh Southeast Asian Games in Thailand, the fifth for Bangkok (previously hosted the 1959 Southeast Asian Peninsular Games, the 1967 Southeast Asian Peninsular Games, the 1975 Southeast Asian Peninsular Games, and the 1985 Southeast Asian Games), and the first hosted in Chonburi and Songkhla.

Host selection
As per Southeast Asian Games traditions, hosting duties are rotated among the Southeast Asian Games Federation (SEAGF) member countries. Each country is assigned to host the event in a predetermined year, but the country could choose to withdraw or not host that edition.

2019 disruption
On 21 July 2017, the Philippine Sports Commission (PSC) announced that it was withdrawing its support for the Philippine hosting of the 2019 Southeast Asian Games saying that government decided to reallocate funds meant for hosting to the rehabilitation efforts of Marawi which was left devastated following the Marawi crisis. and it was later reported that the POC's insistence on handling all matters of the hosting; finance, security and the conduct of the Games as it did for the 2005 Southeast Asian Games led to the PSC's withdrawal of support.

On 10 August 2017, Maj. Gen. Charouck Arirachakaran, the vice president and secretary general of the National Olympic Committee of Thailand (NOCT) stated that Thai prime minister Prayut Chan-o-cha agreed on the 2019 Games replacement plan after the Philippine's withdrawal. The candidates were Chiang Mai, Chonburi and Songkhla.

Six days later, the Philippines, through the Philippine Olympic Committee president Peping Cojuangco, confirmed that the country would host the 2019 Games, after Cojuangco wrote Philippine president Rodrigo Duterte and appealed for reconsideration.

2025 confirmation
In December 2021, Thailand was nominated as the host country for the 2025 Southeast Asian Games at the SEAGF Council and Executive Board Meetings in Hanoi, Vietnam. Five months later, SEAGF Council and Executive Board officially announced that Thailand will be the host country for the event in 2025, and initially nominated Bangkok as the host city. In addition, Malaysia and Singapore were confirmed as host countries for the 2027 and 2029 editions.

After the confirmation, this marked the seventh time that Thailand had hosted the Southeast Asian Games. Its capital city, Bangkok staged the inaugural Southeast Asian Peninsular Games in 1959, and again in 1967, 1975, and 1985; when the games itself had already became known as the Southeast Asian Games. However, both the 1995 and 2007 editions were taken place in the Thai provinces of Chiang Mai and Nakhon Ratchasima respectively.

Bidding and election
On 11 October 2022, Dato Seri Chaipak Siriwat, the vice president of the National Olympic Committee of Thailand (NOCT) revealed the framework of the bidding process that the host cities/provinces should expend for the games at a budget-friendly cost, and they don't have a requirement to build venues anymore. Unlike 2019 and 2021 editions that their competition venues were spread over 23 and 12 cities respectively, the possible number of host cities for the games should be limited to 3 or 4.

Eight bidding parties from twelve cities/provinces interested in hosting the games were nominated by Prachum Boontiem, the vice governor of the Sports Authority of Thailand (SAT), in October 2022. Bangkok, Chiang Mai, Nakhon Ratchasima, and Songkhla were submitted as sole bids, while Bangkok,Chonburi,Songkhla, Krabi,Phuket,Trang,Amnat Charoen,Sisaket,Ubon Ratchathani and Yasothon were submitted as projects to bidding provinces. Although the bidding process was started in October 2022, some bidding parties were revealed their bidding campaigns earlier: Ubon Ratchathani in April 2016, Chonburi in January 2019, and Krabi/Phuket/Trang in February 2021.

Three provinces: Bangkok Metropolitan Region, Chonburi Province, and Songkhla Province were chosen to host the 33rd Southeast Asian Games and  Nakhon Ratchasima Province were awarded the 13th ASEAN Para Games respectively by the Sports Authority of Thailand (SAT) on 13 January 2023 and approved by the Cabinet of Thailand in February 2023. The four hosting cities were the first on to host the Southeast Asian Games history chosen through a bidding process.

The Games

Sports

The section 34 of the Southeast Asian Games Federation charter and rules state that the programme of the Southeast Asian Games shall include not less than 22 sports with athletics and aquatics (including swimming and diving) as compulsory sports or "sports category I", a minimum of 14 Olympic and Asian Games sports or "sports category II" and a maximum of 8, but not less than 2, other sports or "sports category III".

Following the host selection, the Sports Authority of Thailand (SAT) initially announced that the Games would feature forty-three sports, according to the Games charter. All of the sports were competed in the Thailand National Games and the joint cities/provinces can provide venues and facilities to host these sports.

The numbers in parenthesis represents the number of events in each discipline.

a: sports governed by a member of the Association of Summer Olympic International Federations (ASOIF). 
b: sports governed by a member of the Association of International Olympic Winter Sports Federations (AIOWF).
c: sports governed by a member of the Association of IOC Recognised International Sports Federations (ARISF).
d: sports governed by a member of the Alliance of Independent Recognized Members of Sports (AIMS).
e: sports governed by a member of neither ARISF nor AIMS.

Participating National Olympic Committees

All eleven National Olympic Committee (NOC) members of the Southeast Asian Games Federation (SEAGF) are expected to take part in the Games. It will be the first time that Timor Leste compete in the Games as a Southeast Asian Games Federation member and an ASEAN member.

The numbers in parenthesis represents the number of participants entered.

See also

2026 ASEAN Para Games in Nakhon Ratchasima

References

 
Southeast Asian Games
Southeast Asian Games
Southeast Asian Games
Southeast Asian Games in Thailand
Sports competitions in Bangkok
Sports competitions in Chonburi Province
Sports competitions in Songkhla Province
Southeast Asian Games 
Southeast Asian Games by year